Thomas "Tommy" A Johnson (birth unknown – death unknown) was an English professional rugby league footballer who played in the 1930s and 1940s.

Playing career

International honours
Tommy Johnson won a cap for England while at Hull in 1941 against Wales.

County Cup Final appearances
Tommy Johnson played  in Hull FC's 10-18 defeat by Huddersfield in the 1938–39 Yorkshire County Cup Final during the 1938–39 season at Odsal Stadium, Bradford on Saturday 22 October 1938, and played  in the 0-10 defeat by Wakefield Trinity in the 1946–47 Yorkshire County Cup Final during the 1946–47 season at Headingley Stadium on Saturday 31 November 1946.

References

External links
Search for "Johnson" at rugbyleagueproject.org
 (archived by web.archive.org) Stats → Past Players → J at hullfc.com
 (archived by web.archive.org) Statistics at hullfc.com

England national rugby league team players
English rugby league players
Hull F.C. players
Place of birth missing
Place of death missing
Rugby league halfbacks
Year of birth missing
Year of death missing